IBM CityOne or IBM INNOV8: CityOne is a city-building simulation game, introduced on May 4, 2010 by IBM at its in-house software conference Impact 2010. It was released on October 4, 2010.

References

External links 
 Official IBM CityOne game
 IBM Serious Gaming website

2010 video games
Browser games
City-building games
Simulation software
Video games developed in the United States